Vasheh may refer to:
 Vasheh, Markazi
 Vasheh, Khomeyn, Markazi Province